Aaron Matthew Westbrooks (born 25 November 1986) is an Irish former professional basketball player. He played for the Irish Under 20 national team, and the senior national team.

Early career
Born and raised in Dublin, Ireland, Westbrooks attended St. Fintan's High School where he was part of the All-Ireland Championship team. His father, Jerome, coached Killester of the Irish Superleague during the 2004–05 season. As a 17-year-old, Westbrooks was entrusted by his father to fill the void left by a departing player. In 19 games for Killester in 2004–05, he averaged 7.1 points, 3.6 rebounds, 1.8 assists and 2.0 steals per game.

College career
In 2005, Westbrooks moved to the United States and enrolled at Trinity College. He subsequently joined the Bantams men's basketball team for his freshman season in 2005–06. He went on to help the Bantams win the 2008 NESCAC championship while garnering NESCAC Defensive Player of the Year honours for the season. In his four-year career at Trinity, he played 102 games (100 starts) and averaged 6.0 points, 3.5 rebounds and 1.8 assists per game.

Professional career
After graduating from Trinity College in 2009, Westbrooks signed with the Leicester Riders of the British Basketball League for the 2009–10 season. In his lone professional season, he played 37 games and averaged 3.7 points and 1.8 rebounds per game.

Westbrooks was set to re-join Killester for the 2010–11 season, but ultimately did not.

Personal life
Westbrooks is the son of Jerome and Lois Westbrooks, and has four siblings: Michael, Isaac, Leah and Eric. Michael and Isaac both played alongside Westbrooks with the Irish national team during the 2009 European qualifiers. All three of his brothers also had stints playing for Killester, while his sister played college basketball for Mount St. Mary's University in Maryland.

Westbrooks is the Founder and Camp Director of Euro Star Basketball Camp.

References

External links
Eurobasket.com profile
FIBA Europe profile

1986 births
Living people
Irish men's basketball players
Leicester Riders players
Shooting guards
Small forwards
Sportspeople from Dublin (city)
Trinity Bantams men's basketball players
Black Irish sportspeople
Irish expatriate basketball people in the United Kingdom
Irish expatriate sportspeople in England